Tillandsia acuminata is a species in the genus Tillandsia. This species is native to Bolivia and Ecuador.

References

acuminata
Flora of Bolivia
Flora of Ecuador